Point Rock is a hamlet in the northeastern corner of the town of Lee in Oneida County, New York, United States. It only consists of a few houses and a closed bar now.

References

Hamlets in New York (state)
Utica–Rome metropolitan area
Hamlets in Oneida County, New York